The sixth season of The Voice Kids of Vietnam- Giọng hát Việt nhí began on 8 September 2018 on VTV3. The coaching panel this season consists of six coaches divided into three duo coaches. Veteran coaches Hồ Hoài Anh & Lưu Hương Giang returned to the show after a two-season hiatus, as well as Vũ Cát Tường and Soobin Hoàng Sơn who both returned from the last season. Singer Bảo Anh and music producer Khắc Hưng joined as new coaches. This season marked the first time in any version of The Voice worldwide to have three different duo coaches, and the second time in the whole franchise that the judging panel consists of six coaches, following the Belgian-Flemish Kids version.

14-year-old Hà Quỳnh Như was announced the winner of the season. It was Hồ Hoài Anh & Lưu Hương Giang's third victory as coaches throughout the series.

Coaches and hosts
The coaching panel was entirely modified in comparison to the last season. On June 12, 2018, it was revealed that all coaches this season would be duos and the husband-and-wife duo Hồ Hoài Anh and Lưu Hương Giang, who served as a duo coach for the first three seasons, would return for the sixth season. A week later, Vũ Cát Tường confirmed that she is returning to the show for her third year. The following day, Soobin Hoàng Sơn also confirmed joining the coaching panel for his second year, while former The Voice season 1 contestant Bảo Anh was announced as a new coach. On July 31, music producer Khắc Hưng was announced as the new sixth coach for the sixth season. On the taping day at August 2, 2018, it was revealed that the two new coaches would form a new duo coach, whereas Soobin and Vũ Cát Tường would combine as a duo coach. Meanwhile, The Voice season 4 winner Ali Hoàng Dương was appointed as the new host for season 6, replacing former host Thành Trung.

Teams
Color key

Blind auditions
Filming for the blind auditions began on August 2, 2018. The blind auditions consists of five episodes, airing from September 8 to October 20, because two episodes were delayed to the following week due to two state funerals. Each coach has the length of the contestant's performance to choose them for their team. If more than two coaches want the same contestant, the contestant will choose which team they want to join. The blind auditions end when all teams are full. However, in this season two new rules were introduced:
 The Block button, which was adopted from the fourteenth season of the U.S version, would prevent a coach from getting an artist if they turn their chairs. Each coach only had one Block per audition. 
 The Mute button, which prevents a coach from talking with an artist in order to convince them to join their team, but instead could still do any kind of body language to interact with the contestant. However, the Mute only adds excitement to the program, as contestant can still pick the muted team. Each coach had only one Mute per audition. The Mute can only be used when the chairs are turned, as the Block button will turn into the Mute.

Color key

Episode 1 (8 September)

Episode 2 (15 September)

Episode 3 (29 September)
Due to the state funeral of Vietnamese President Trần Đại Quang, the third episode of the Blind Audition was delayed for one week.

Episode 4 (13 October)
Due to the state funeral of former Vietnamese Party chief Đỗ Mười, the fourth episode of the Blind Audition was delayed for one week.

Proper evaluation was not done for this girl Nguyễn Thu Huyền. The song was awarded as one of the TOP 10 | Most Difficult Songs to sing in The Voice Kids. The feedback by the viewer has also criticized the judgement of judges. Check comments section. The song (sung by this girl) is in the link

Episode 5 (20 October)

The Battles
The Battle Round was taped on September 18, 2018. The 15 contestants in each team will be divided into five match-ups, each with three contestants. Each group will perform a pre-rehearsed song on the stage. After going on stage to finish the confrontation song with the contestants and coaches, the coaches will name one of the three contestants of each group as the winner. This season, the Battle Round introduced the Save button that allowed a coach to keep a contestant they just eliminated from the competition, which is similar to the Knockout stage of the fourteenth season of the U.S version. Contestants who won their battles or saved by their coaches will advance to the Playoffs.

Due to health problems, coach Khắc Hưng was not able to attend the Battle round, leaving Bảo Anh to make decisions on the result of the Battles of team Khắc Hưng & Bảo Anh alone. The advisors for each team are: singer Hồ Quỳnh Hương for team Soobin & Vũ Cát Tường, former coaches Đông Nhi & Ông Cao Thắng for team Hồ Hoài Anh & Lưu Hương Giang, and Dương Triệu Vũ for team Khắc Hưng & Bảo Anh.

Colour key

The Playoffs
Similar to the previous season, all the playoffs rounds were pre-recorded until the Playoff, Part 5 (Top 10). Results are voted on in real-time by audience attending the show in the filming location by both tele-voting and mobile app.

This season, two Wildcards are awarded. The first one would bring back a contestant who was eliminated prior to the Semi-finals (including the Battles) straight to the Semi-finals, while the second one would advance an artist eliminated in the Semi-final to the Live Finale. Audience can vote for the Wildcard with the same method for the contestant in Playoff rounds.

Special guest stars performed on the Live Semi-final and the Live Final. Singers Hồng Thắm, Phan Mạnh Quỳnh along with former contestants Erik (season 1 contestant), Phương Mỹ Chi (season 1 runner-up), Đỗ Thị Hoài Ngọc (season 5 runner-up) and Dương Ngọc Ánh (season 5 winner) performed with the semi-finalists on the Semi-final. Trần Minh Như (The X Factor Vietnam season 2 winner) and Trần Ngọc Ánh (The Voice season 5 winner) performed on the Final.

Color key:

Round 1: Minishow (17 November, 24 November and 1 December)
As first applied in the previous season, in the first round of the Playoffs, all teams had to set up a minishow which consists of performances from all team members and concludes with a group performance of the coaches and the contestants. Each team performed on one night and nominated two contestants for elimination at the end of the night. The final result was announced after all teams performed at the end of night 3. In a new twist, the team receiving the most public vote would be declared safe and would have all team members advanced to the next round, while the two other coaches would lose the two contestants nominated for elimination earlier.

 Team Hồ Hoài Anh & Lưu Hương Giang received the most votes from the public, therefore had two contestants nominated for elimination saved.

Round 2: Top 14 (8 December)
The remaining 14 artists performed altogether at night 4 for the public's vote. At the end of the show, four artists received the fewest votes were eliminated.

Round 3: Top 10 (15 December)
The remaining 10 artists performed altogether at night 5 for the public's vote. The bottom four artists were eliminated at the end of the night. During the fifth show, it was announced that the Semi-final Wildcard was awarded to Phạm Anh Khôi from team Khắc Hưng & Bảo Anh, after he received the most votes from the public via mobile app.

Round 4: Semifinals- Top 7 (22 December)
The Semifinal was recorded live, featuring competition performances from the remaining 7 artists for the public's vote as well as performances with guest artists. Because of force majeure reasons, coach Hồ Hoài Anh could not attend the Semifinal and was replaced by the show's music executive Lưu Thiên Hương. At the end of the night, the three artists that received the most votes from the public were automatically sent through to the Grand Finale, while the fourth finalist who was saved by Wildcard would be announced on Tuesday, December 25. The recipient of the Finals Wildcard was Nguyễn Minh Chiến from team Khắc Hưng & Bảo Anh.

Round 5: Finals- Top 4 (29 December)
The Live Final was recorded live on 29 December 2018. Each finalist performed two times: a solo song and a duet song with his/her coach. The contestant who received the most votes from the public would be crowned the winner.

Hà Quỳnh Như from team Hồ Hoài Anh & Lưu Hương Giang was crowned winner after scoring 37.98% of the public vote, followed by Đào Đình Anh Tuấn from team Soobin Hoàng Sơn & Vũ Cát Tường with 35.76%, Nguyễn Minh Chiến from team Khắc Hưng & Bảo Anh with 13.31% and Nguyễn Trần Xuân Phương from team Soobin Hoàng Sơn & Vũ Cát Tường with 12.95%.

Elimination chart
Artist's info
  Artist from Team Soobin Hoàng Sơn & Vũ Cát Tường
  Artist from Team Hồ Hoài Anh & Lưu Hương Giang
  Artist from Team Khắc Hưng & Bảo Anh

Result details

Contestants who appeared on previous shows or seasons
 Nguyễn Lê Minh Nguyên and Phạm Lê Quốc Hưng both competed on season 5 of The Voice Kids and joined team Vũ Cát Tường, but were eliminated at the Battles.
 Phạm Minh Ngọc and Nguyễn Minh Nhật both competed on season 4 and 5 of The Voice Kids respectively, but failed to make a team.
 Trần Ngọc Gia Hân and Nguyễn Trần Phương Trúc both competed on season 5 of The Voice Kids and joined team Hương Tràm & Tiên Cookie, but were eliminated at the Battles.
 Phạm Ngọc Thiên Thanh competed on season 5 of The Voice Kids and joined team Soobin Hoàng Sơn, but was eliminated at the Battles.

References

2010s Vietnamese television series
1